Casa Manana is a 1951 American musical film directed by Jean Yarbrough and written by William Raynor. The film stars Virginia Welles, Robert Clarke, Robert Karnes, Tony Roux, Carol Brewster and Paul Maxey. The film was released on June 10, 1951, by Monogram Pictures.

Plot

Cast          
Virginia Welles as Linda Mason
Robert Clarke as Larry Sawyer
Robert Karnes as Horace Fairchild III
Tony Roux as Pedro Gonzales
Carol Brewster as 'Honey' La Verne
Paul Maxey as Maury Sanford
Jean Richey as 'Rusty'
Jim Rio as Jake
Frank Rio as Jock
Larry Rio as Jack
Eddie Le Baron as Orchestra Leader 
Spade Cooley as Bandleader
Yadira Jiménez as Dancer 
Olga Pérez as Olga Pérez

References

External links
 

1951 films
American musical films
1951 musical films
Monogram Pictures films
Films directed by Jean Yarbrough
American black-and-white films
1950s English-language films
1950s American films